Julio César Atilano Hernández (born February 23, 1988) is a former professional Mexican footballer who last played for Correcaminos UAT.

He played with San José F.C. of the Liga de Balompié Mexicano during the league's inaugural season.

References

1988 births
Living people
Mexican footballers
Association football forwards
Unión de Curtidores footballers
La Piedad footballers
Toros Neza footballers
C.F. Mérida footballers
Irapuato F.C. footballers
Correcaminos UAT footballers
Ascenso MX players
Liga Premier de México players
Footballers from Guanajuato
Sportspeople from León, Guanajuato
Liga de Balompié Mexicano players